Camelia la Texana is a Spanish-language telenovela produced by Campanario Entertainment and Argos Comunicación and distributed by United States-based television network Telemundo Studios, Miami. The story is based on the song titled "Contrabando y Traición" by Los Tigres del Norte.

As part of the 2014 season, Telemundo aired Camelia la Texana from February 25, 2014, to May 22, 2014, weeknights at 10pm/9c, replacing Santa Diabla. As with most of its other telenovelas, the network broadcast English subtitles as closed captions on CC3.

Synopsis 
The story of a naive and beautiful young woman who tries to escape
her destiny. The story begins in the 1970s when young Camelia and her mother flee one of Mexico's most dangerous capos, Don Antonio. Camelia's beauty attracts a lot of
attention, jealousy from other women and infatuation on the part of many men, who fall powerless at her feet. Her mother tries to protect her from the fate that pursues her, but as she sets off in search of adventure Camelia meets the man who will be the love of her life, and also her betrayer: Emilio Varela. Emilio promises Camelia the moon and the stars, but instead he breaks her heart.

Production 
The telenovela was shot in Mexico City and filming began in June 2013 and ended in early 2014.

Cast

Main 
 Sara Maldonado as Camelia Pineda "La Texana"
 Erik Hayser as Emilio Varela / Aarón Varela
 Andrés Palacios as Teniente Facundo García
 Dagoberto Gama as Don Antonio Treviño

Secondary 
 Luis Ernesto Franco as Gerardo Robles "El Alacrán"
 Arcelia Ramírez as Ignacia "La Nacha"
 Eréndira Ibarra as Alison Bailow de Varela
 Rodrigo Oviedo as Dionisio Osuna
 Claudette Maillé as Rosaura Pineda
 Tamara Mazarraza as Lu Treviño
 Estefania Villarreal as Mireya Osuna
 Víctor Alfredo Jiménez as Xiang Treviño
 Peter Theis as Carson
 Iñaki Goci as Jacinto Garabito
 Ana Paula de León as Alma Treviño
 Cosmo González Muñoz as Emilio Varela Bailow, Jr.
 Joaquín Garrido as Arnulfo Navarro

Recurring 
 Liz Gallardo as Concepción Olvera "La Cuquis"
 Bárbara Singer as Ofelia Osuna
 Arnulfo Reyes Sánchez as Teniente Pedro Ruìz 
 Alejandro Belmonte as Salvador "Chava"
 Germán Valdés III as Ricardo "Rico"

Guest 
 Danna García as Rosa
 Paco Mauri as Timoteo Treviño

Awards and nominations

References

External links 
 Camelia: La Texana Website (Telemundo)
 Website

American television series based on telenovelas
Telemundo telenovelas
Spanish-language American telenovelas
Mexican telenovelas
2014 telenovelas
2014 American television series debuts
2014 American television series endings
Television series about organized crime
Works about Mexican drug cartels